Michael Brannigan (born November 12, 1996, in Huntington, New York), commonly known as Mikey Brannigan, is an American track and field athlete. He was not allowed to compete at the collegiate level because he could not meet NCAA academic standards, due to Autism. He competed at the 2016 Summer Paralympics in the men's 1500-meters race, winning a gold medal.

Personal life

Childhood 
Brannigan was born on November 12, 1996, in East Northport, New York, to parents Edie and Kevin Brannigan. Both parents said they knew of his disability at 18 months of age, and he was diagnosed with Autism at age 2. He was nonverbal until age 5. He began running from a young age. He attended Northport High School, accomplishing an extremely successful distance running career at the High school level. Despite his disability, he still saw academic success, taking and passing Algebra I against the recommendations of his school.

References 

1996 births
Living people
People from Huntington, New York
Athletes (track and field) at the 2016 Summer Paralympics
Medalists at the 2016 Summer Paralympics
Paralympic track and field athletes of the United States
American male middle-distance runners
Paralympic gold medalists for the United States
Paralympic medalists in athletics (track and field)
Sportspeople with autism
Competitors in athletics with intellectual disability
Medalists at the 2015 Parapan American Games
Sportspeople from Suffolk County, New York